Smoking in Cuba is prevalent, with a Gallup poll  in May 2007  revealing that 45% of Cuban people  had smoked on the day before the survey.

Turkey, Greece (40%), and Lebanon (41%) also had high rates of smoking according to the poll.

The Peoples' Organization of Cuba (PO Cuba) said smoking rates are too high in the country and must be lowered

References

 Cuba: No Ifs, Ands Or Butts - CBS News
 Havana Corner: No Smoking In Cuba? | Cuba | Cigar Aficionado
 Our Island Empire: A Hand-book of Cuba, Porto Rico, Hawaii, and the ... - Charles Morris p. 486.
 Tobacco: Its History, Varieties, Culture, Manufacture and Commerce, with an ... - E. R. Billings pp. 273-274.
 JNCI, Journal of the National Cancer Institute - National Cancer Institute (U.S.) p. 1037

Cuba
Politics of Cuba